De Witt Clinton Fort (June 8, 1830, Hardeman County, Tennessee – May 25, 1868, Hempstead, Texas). He was a member of the Texas House of Representatives and soldier in the Confederate army during the American Civil War.

Personal background
Fort received his A.B. degree from Centre College, Danville, Kentucky in 1850.  
He was admitted to the practice of law in 1852 in Mississippi and in 1857 in Texas.
He was elected to serve in the Eighth Texas Legislature (1859-1861) and the special "Adjourned Session" (March 18, 1861 - April 9, 1861).

Fort closed his Austin County, Texas law office for the duration of the war in June 1861 and paid his own travel expenses to join J.E.B. Stuart's cavalry in Virginia for the First Battle of Manassas.  He was captured in Tennessee following the Battle of Farmington in May 1862, but escaped by leaping from a Union prison steamboat into the Mississippi River. Later, he created "Fort's Scouts," a small unit of Confederate Cavalry, acting in concert with General Nathan Bedford Forrest.  By the end of the war he had served with the Confederate units in Texas, Virginia, Mississippi, Tennessee and Missouri.  He was wounded during the closing weeks of the war.  His unit surrendered about one month after General Lee's surrender.

Fort was "clubfooted" and badly crippled from birth and unsuitable for military service.  However, by the time he surrendered, his small band had closed down the Memphis & Charleston Railroad to Union military travel and only large Union cavalry patrols would venture outside the Union military headquarters at Memphis, TN.

He carried the sobriquet, Captain "Clubfoot" Fort, C.S.A. proudly.

References
 14 Letters to A Friend by Laurier B. McDonald 

1830 births
1868 deaths
People from Hardeman County, Tennessee
People from Austin, Texas
People of Texas in the American Civil War
Centre College alumni
Texas lawyers
Members of the Texas House of Representatives
19th-century American politicians
19th-century American lawyers